Phyllostachys meyeri  is a species of bamboo found in Hunan, China in open forest at elevations around 600 meters

References

External links
 
 

meyeri
Flora of China